Josef Degeorgi (born 19 January 1960) is a former international Austrian footballer.

Degeorgi won the Austrian league four times and the Austrian cup three times while playing for Austria Wien from 1983 to 1990.

References

External links
 
 Profile -  Austria-archiv

1960 births
Living people
Austrian footballers
Austria international footballers
FK Austria Wien players
Austrian Football Bundesliga players
1982 FIFA World Cup players

Association football defenders
People from Baden District, Austria
Footballers from Lower Austria